WEO may refer to:

 Warehouse Economy Outlet, a 1970s American discount supermarket chain operated by A&P
 World Economic Outlook, a half-yearly publication published by International Monetary Fund
 World Energy Outlook, an annual publication
 World Eskimo Indian Olympics, formerly known as the World Eskimo Olympics

See also 
 WEOS, call letters for a radio station in Geneva, New York
 Weo, a settlement in Nauru